The JK Memorial is a mausoleum, presidential memorial and museum dedicated to Juscelino Kubitschek (1902–1976), the 21st President of Brazil and the founder of Brasília, capital city of Brazil since 1960. Designed by Oscar Niemeyer, the memorial is located in the Monumental Axis in Brasília. It is the final resting place of President Kubitschek.

References
Notes

External links
 Official website

Modernist architecture in Brazil
Oscar Niemeyer buildings
Tourist attractions in Brasília